Ayesha Dharker (born 16 March 1978) is a British actress, known for her appearance as Queen Jamillia, the Queen of Naboo, in Star Wars: Episode II – Attack of the Clones, and for her stage performances.

Her other film roles include starring as a young woman brainwashed into contemplating becoming a suicide bomber in the Tamil film The Terrorist (1997), for which she was awarded Best Artistic Contribution by an Actress at the Cairo International Film Festival and nominated for a National Film Award for Best Actress.

She has also appeared in Outsourced and The Mistress of Spices, television series such as Arabian Nights, and the West End and Broadway musical Bombay Dreams.

Family 
Dharker was born on 16 March 1978 in Mumbai, India.

She is the daughter of Imtiaz Dharker, a poet, artist and documentary film-maker, and Anil Dharker, a columnist and an ex-editor of the Indian men's magazine Debonair. Her father is from India and her mother, born in Lahore, was raised in Scotland, United Kingdom.

In May 2010 she married Robert Taylor in St Giles Cripplegate, London.

Career 
Dharker made her screen debut in the 1989 François Villiers film Manika, une vie plus tard. She subsequently went on to star in many American, French and Indian films. She has had many television roles in the UK, particularly in Cutting It and Life Isn't All Ha Ha Hee Hee, in which she co-starred with Meera Syal.

In the international award-winning film The Terrorist (1999), she played the lead character Malli, a role that earned her a nomination for the National Film Award for Best Actress in India and the Cairo Film Festival award for Best Artistic Contribution by an Actress.

Dharker's most internationally recognised role came in 2002 when she played Queen Jamillia, the Queen of Naboo, in Star Wars: Episode II – Attack of the Clones. In the same year she appeared in the critically acclaimed Anita and Me. Dharker starred in the Andrew Lloyd Webber musical Bombay Dreams, both in London's West End and on Broadway (2004). She also starred in The Mistress of Spices (2005).

She has appeared in the episode "Planet of the Ood" of the long-running BBC sci-fi television series, Doctor Who as Solana Mercurio.

In 2006, she played the role of Asha in the film Outsourced.

In 2008, she played the role of Tara Mandal in the ITV soap opera Coronation Street.

In 2010, she played doctor's wife Kamini Sharma opposite Sanjeev Bhaskar in the BBC's comedy-drama series The Indian Doctor.

In 2017, Dharker began playing Nina Karnik in a returning role on the long-running BBC drama Holby City.

In 2020, she appeared as Dr. Sarai in The Father, which was nominated for an Academy Award. On 16 January 2022, Dharker appeared in Vera in the episode "As the Crow Flies" in the role of Anika Naidu.

Audiobooks

Dharker was the narrator for the audiobook version of Brick Lane by Monica Ali (2003).

Filmography

Films

Television

Theatre

References

External links 

Ayesha Dharker and Manu Narayan – Downstage Center interview at American Theatre Wing.org

Living people
1978 births
Actresses from Mumbai
Indian emigrants to England
English film actresses
English musical theatre actresses
English radio actresses
English soap opera actresses
English stage actresses
English television actresses
British actresses of Indian descent
British people of Scottish descent
English expatriates in India
Actresses in Hindi cinema
Actresses in Tamil cinema
British expatriate actresses in India
European actresses in India
21st-century English actresses
21st-century British actresses